The General Assembly of Newfoundland and Labrador (known as the General Assembly of Newfoundland until 6 December 2001) is the legislature of the province of Newfoundland and Labrador, Canada. Today, the legislature is made of two elements: the King of Canada, represented by the lieutenant governor of Newfoundland and Labrador, and the unicameral assembly called the Newfoundland and Labrador House of Assembly. The legislature was first established in 1832.

Like the Canadian federal government, Newfoundland and Labrador uses a Westminster-style parliamentary government, in which members are sent to the House of Assembly after general elections. The leader of the  party with the most seats is called upon by the lieutenant governor of Newfoundland and Labrador to form a government and assume the position of Premier of Newfoundland and Labrador and Executive Council of Newfoundland and Labrador.  The premier acts as Newfoundland and Labrador's head of government, while the King of Canada is head of state.

The legislature was originally bicameral. From 1832 to 1934, it had an upper house called the Legislative Council of Newfoundland. That house was abolished in 1934.

Between 1934 and Newfoundland's entry into Canadian Confederation in 1949, Newfoundland was under Commission of Government, and the General Assembly was suspended.

List of General Assemblies

Pre-Confederation

Post-Confederation

References